Rafael Alexis Quiles Hernández, known professionally as Álex Gárgolas, is a reggaeton producer best known for the Gárgolas series which has been five albums so far.

His 2006 installation of the series managed to debut at number 181 on the Billboard 200, reaching number 6 on both the Latin Albums and Latin Rhythm Albums charts.

Musical career 
In 1995, using his savings of $300, he produced music by a few fledgling artists, two who became the well-known, chart-topping reggaeton artists known as Wisin & Yandel.

In 2019, Gárgolas produced "Mi Llamada" (remix), a collaboration with emerging artists from Argentina and Puerto Rico. 

In 2020, Gárgolas spearheaded the production of "Del Barrio a la Ciudad", a song that mixes traditional Mexican corridos with Farruko's urban sound.

In 2022, Gárgolas visited Chile claiming to want to produce a Chilean reggaeton album, but instead offended the urban musical artists of Chile, and left the country without producing any, telling them to "stay in your country".

Discography

Production discography 
 2005: Glou

References

External links 
 Álex Gárgolas
 Interview

1971 births
Living people
Machete Music artists
Reggaeton record producers